Benjamin Stevenson Gay Jr. (born February 28, 1980) is a former American football running back. He spent the 2001 NFL season with the Cleveland Browns.

Born in Houston, Gay was a star running back at Spring High School in Spring, Texas. As a senior in 1997, he was a USA Today first-team All-American. He chose Baylor over Florida, Florida State, and Miami. However, five weeks into his freshman season in 1998, he was kicked off the team for rules violations. He eventually enrolled at Garden City Community College. Playing nine games in 1999, he rushed for 1,442 yards and 17 touchdowns but was dismissed from the team because of his grades and rules violations. He took a job as a bouncer at a bar in Garden City, Kansas.

In 2000, he was signed by the Edmonton Eskimos, but was bolted after the first preseason game. On July 20, 2001, he was signed by the Cleveland Browns. He spent the 2001 NFL season as third-string RB behind James Jackson and Jamel White. His career game came in a 27–17 Browns win at Baltimore on November 18, when he had his first 18 NFL carries for 56 yards, including one touchdown.

On April 24, 2002, the Browns waived Gay, and he signed with the Indianapolis Colts five days later. The Colts released Gay on August 19.

References

External links
NFL.com profile

1980 births
Living people
American football running backs
Baylor University alumni
Cleveland Browns players
Players of American football from Houston
Garden City Broncbusters football players
People from Spring, Texas